Hamad Amar (born 5 November 1964) is an Israeli Druze politician who currently serves as a member of Knesset for Yisrael Beiteinu since 2022, previously serving from 2009 to 2019 and again from 2019 to 2021. Amar also served as a Minister in the Finance Ministry from 2021 to 2022.

Biography
Hamed Amar was born in Shefa-'Amr. In 1982-1986, he served in the Israel Defense Forces. He earned a BA in sociology from Safed College, and a law degree from the Academic Center for Law and Science. Amar lives in Shfaram's al-Fuar neighbourhood. He is married, with three children. He has a fifth degree black belt in Karate, and chairs the Martial Arts Association in Israel. 

Amar runs a Druze youth movement that, as of 2013, had 12,000 members; in addition to emphasizing Druze culture and heritage, the group distributes thousands of food packets a month to families in need.

Political career
He worked as an assistant to Avigdor Lieberman, while he was Minister of National Infrastructure. In 1998, he was elected to Shefa-'Amr's municipal council. He founded and chairs the Druze Youth Association.

Prior to the 2009 elections, he was placed twelfth on the Yisrael Beiteinu list, and entered the Knesset when the party won 15 seats. He stated that the party's slogan "No citizenship without loyalty" is natural for the Druze community. In 2013, he explained his position: "When you contribute to society, and the society benefits, then you will reap the benefits as well."

Amar was instrumental in plans for a subsidiary of General Electric to install wind turbines in northern Israel, citing the benefits from clean energy and new jobs.

In 2018, Amar opposed the Citizenship Law; with fellow Druze MKs Akram Hasson and Saleh Saad, Amar filed a petition against the legislation with the High Court of Justice in July 2018. In August 2018, Amar expressed support for proposed changes to the legislation that would grant special recognition to the Druze community.  

Amar was placed sixth on the Yisrael Beiteinu list for the April 2019 elections, and lost his seat as the party won only five seats. However, five months later he returned to the Knesset as Yisrael Beiteinu won eight seats in the September 2019 elections. He was re-elected to the Knesset in the 2021 elections as Yisrael Beiteinu won seven seats.

In June 2021 Amar was appointed Minister in the Finance Ministry in the thirty-sixth government. Following his appointment, he resigned from the Knesset under the Norwegian Law and was replaced by Limor Magen Telem. In collaboration with other ministers, Amar led the Druze and Circassian Empowerment Program as Minister in the Finance Ministry. In November 2021, the coalition government passed a budget that included 3 billion NIS for the program, which will be used to invest in housing construction, the local education system, infrastructure, transportation and hi-tech employment opportunities for the Druze and Circassian communities.

See also
List of Arab members of the Knesset

References

External links

1964 births
Living people
20th-century Israeli lawyers
21st-century Israeli lawyers
Academic Center for Law and Science alumni
Druze members of the Knesset
Israeli Druze
Israeli sports executives and administrators
Members of the 18th Knesset (2009–2013)
Members of the 19th Knesset (2013–2015)
Members of the 20th Knesset (2015–2019)
Members of the 22nd Knesset (2019–2020)
Members of the 23rd Knesset (2020–2021)
Members of the 24th Knesset (2021–2022)
Members of the 25th Knesset (2022–)
People from Shefa-'Amr
Yisrael Beiteinu politicians
Government ministers of Israel